Brad Lacey (born 11 April 1994) is a South African-born, Australian rugby union player who currently plays for the Western Force in the international Super Rugby competition.   Domestically he is contracted to the Perth Spirit who compete in the National Rugby Championship. His regular playing position is on the wing.

Lacey was a member of the Australia under-20 side which competed in the 2013 and 2014 IRB Junior World Championships in France and New Zealand respectively.

References

1994 births
Living people
Australian rugby union players
Rugby union wings
Perth Spirit players
South African emigrants to Australia
Brisbane City (rugby union) players
Western Force players
Rugby union players from Durban